Mohammadabad-e Sar Cheshmeh Berashk (also Romanized as Moḩammadābād-e Sar Cheshmeh Berāshk; also known as Sar Cheshmeh Berāshk, Mohammad Ābād, Moḩammadābād-e Sar Cheshmeh, Sar Chashmeh, Sar Cheshmeh, and Sar-i-Chashmeh) is a village in Sefid Sang Rural District, Qalandarabad District, Fariman County, Razavi Khorasan Province, Iran. At the 2006 census, its population was 88, in 21 families.

References 

Populated places in Fariman County